The first round of the 1999–2000 UEFA Cup began on 14 September 1999. The round included 38 winners from the qualifying round, 16 losing teams from the Champions League 3rd qualifying round, 3 winners of the Intertoto Cup and 39 new entrants. This narrowed the clubs from 96, down to 48 teams in preparation for the second round.

Seeding

Source:

Summary

|}

Matches

Steaua București won 5–2 on aggregate.

Wolfsburg won 3–2 on aggregate.

Montpellier won 3–2 on aggregate.

Deportivo La Coruña won 2–1 on aggregate.

Udinese won 3–1 on aggregate.

Leeds United won 4–1 on aggregate.

Lyon won 6–1 on aggregate.

Atlético Madrid won 3–1 on aggregate.

MTK Hungária won 2–0 on aggregate.

Anderlecht won 6–1 on aggregate.

Roda JC won 5–1 on aggregate.

Werder Bremen won 6–1 on aggregate.

Viking won 3–1 on aggregate.

Lens won 4–3 on aggregate.

Kilmarnock won 5–0 on aggregate.

2–2 on aggregate; Helsingborg won 4–2 on penalties.

IFK Göteborg won 2–1 on aggregate.

Teplice won 4–2 on aggregate.

Newcastle United won 4–2 on aggregate.

Panathinaikos won 3–0 on aggregate.

Amica Wronki won 5–4 on aggregate.

Vitesse won 2–0 on aggregate.

Grazer AK won 4–2 on aggregate.

Levski Sofia won 3–0 on aggregate.

Celtic won 3–0 on aggregate.

Celta Vigo won 6–3 on aggregate.

Nantes won 4–1 on aggregate.

Aris won 3–2 on aggregate.

Monaco won 6–3 on aggregate.

Inter Bratislava won 3–1 on aggregate.

Lokomotiv Moscow won 5–1 on aggregate.

Widzew Łódź won 2–1 on aggregate.

Roma won 7–1 on aggregate.

Parma won 6–2 on aggregate.

4–4 on aggregate; Hapoel Haifa won on away goals.

AEK Athens won 7–1 on aggregate.

Juventus won 10–2 on aggregate.

West Ham United won 6–1 on aggregate.

Slavia Prague won 3–2 on aggregate.

Mallorca won 3–1 on aggregate.

Benfica won 2–1 on aggregate.

Ajax won 9–2 on aggregate.

Tottenham Hotspur won 3–0 on aggregate.

Bologna won 5–2 on aggregate.

Legia Warsaw won 2–0 on aggregate.

PAOK won 9–0 on aggregate.

Grasshopper won 3–1 on aggregate.

Zürich won 5–3 on aggregate.

External links
First Round Information
RSSSF Page

1999–2000 UEFA Cup